Veronica Escobar (born September 15, 1969) is an American politician serving as the U.S. representative for , based in El Paso, since 2019. A member of the Democratic Party, she served as an El Paso County commissioner from 2007 to 2011 and the El Paso county judge from 2011 until 2017.

Early life and education
Escobar is a native of El Paso, where she was born in 1969. She grew up near her family's dairy farm with her parents and four brothers. Escobar attended Loretto Academy and Burges High School, before getting her bachelor's degree at the University of Texas at El Paso (UTEP) and her master's degree from New York University.

Early political career 
Escobar worked as a nonprofit executive and as Raymond Caballero's communications director when he was mayor of El Paso. When Caballero failed to get reelected, Escobar—along with Susie Byrd, attorney Steve Ortega and businessman Beto O'Rourke—considered entering public service; they started to discuss grassroots strategies with the goals of improving urban planning, creating a more diversified economy with more highly skilled jobs, as well as ending systemic corruption among city leadership.

Escobar was elected as a County Commissioner of El Paso County in 2006 and as the County Judge of El Paso County in 2010. O’Rourke, Byrd and Ortega also all ran for office and won; they came to be collectively referred to as "The Progressives." She also taught English and Chicano literature at UTEP and El Paso Community College.

U.S. House of Representatives

Elections 
2018

As the district is a solidly Democratic, majority-Hispanic district, whoever won the Democratic primary was heavily favored in November. Escobar won the six-way Democratic primary with 61% of the vote.

In June 2018, Escobar and O'Rourke led protests in Tornillo, Texas, against the Trump administration family separation policy that involved separating immigrant children from their families. Tornillo is just miles from the Rio Grande, the river that forms the border between the U.S. and Mexico in Texas. The Trump administration had created a "tent-city" in Tornillo, where separated children were being held without their parents. O'Rourke called this practice "un-American" and the responsibility of all Americans.

Escobar won the general election on November 6, defeating Republican Rick Seeberger. She became the first woman to represent the 16th. Escobar and Sylvia Garcia of Houston became the first Latina congresswomen from Texas. Although the 16th has been a majority-Hispanic district since at least the 1970s, Escobar is only the second Hispanic ever to represent it, the first being Silvestre Reyes, O'Rourke's predecessor.

2020

Escobar ran for reelection. She was unopposed in the Democratic primary and faced the Republican nominee, realtor Irene Armendariz-Jackson, in the general election. Escobar won with 64.7% of the vote to Armendariz-Jackson's 35.3%.

Tenure 

On November 13, 2019, Escobar was elected as a freshman class representative in a secret ballot by her peers, filling the role of Katie Hill, who had resigned from Congress.

On February 4, 2020, Escobar delivered the Spanish-language response to President Trump's State of the Union Address. Her remarks touched on healthcare, immigration, the national debt, the importance of diversity, the 2019 mass shooting in El Paso, wealth inequality, gun violence, and the United States–Mexico–Canada trade agreement. She called Trump and the Republican-controlled Senate "the greatest threat to our security."

Committee assignments 

 Committee on Armed Services
 Subcommittee on Military Personnel
 Subcommittee on Readiness
 Committee on the Judiciary
 Subcommittee on the Constitution, Civil Rights and Civil Liberties
 Subcommittee on Immigration and Citizenship

Caucus memberships 

 Congressional Hispanic Caucus
 Congressional Progressive Caucus
 New Democrat Coalition

Electoral history

Personal life 
Escobar and her husband, Michael Pleters, have two children.

See also
List of Hispanic/Latino American jurists
List of Hispanic and Latino Americans in the United States Congress
Women in the United States House of Representatives

References

External links

 Congresswoman Veronica Escobar official U.S. House website
Veronica Escobar for Congress

|-

County commissioners in Texas
County judges in Texas
Democratic Party members of the United States House of Representatives from Texas
Female members of the United States House of Representatives
Hispanic and Latino American members of the United States Congress
Hispanic and Latino American women in politics
Living people
New York University alumni
Politicians from El Paso, Texas
University of Texas at El Paso alumni
University of Texas at El Paso faculty
Women in Texas politics
1969 births
American women academics
21st-century American women
Hispanic and Latino American judges